The 2007 Copa Aerosur, was an instance of the annual Bolivian football tournament held in La Paz, Cochabamba and Santa Cruz, sponsored by the AeroSur airline.

This event was the 4th such event. In this tournament teams from the 2nd and 3rd divisions participated. The winner team was given free tickets on Aerosur to play their games during the tournament (and for the remainder of 2007) and $10,000, the runners-up-up receiving $5,000. The runners-up won a 75% discount in airfares and the other participants accessed a 50% discount on tickets by agreeing to display the airline's logo on their uniforms.

The 2007 version of the cup had three novelties: ties were defined by penalty shoot-out in all instances of the tournament; the implementation of a parallel U-18 tournament U-18; a rematch to be played between its champion and the champion of the Copa Aerosur del Sur and 2 foreign clubs.

1st qualifying round

|}

2nd qualifying round
 Teams from the 2006 Copa Simón Bolívar qualified for this round.
 For the first time Tahuichi Academy participated in this competition.

|}

3rd qualifying round
 Only teams from the LPFB qualified for this round, not the winners of the 2nd Round.

|}

Bracket

Semi-final

|}

Final

|}

References

2007 domestic association football cups
2007
2007 in Bolivian football